Émile Sauret (22 May 1852 – 12 February 1920) was a French violinist and composer. Sauret wrote over 100 violin pieces, including a famous cadenza for the first movement of Niccolò Paganini's First Violin Concerto, and the "Gradus ad Parnassum" (1894).

Biography
Sauret was born in Dun-le-Roi in 1852. He began studying violin at the Conservatoire de Strasbourg at the age of six, and with a reputation as child prodigy he began performing two years later. He studied under Charles Auguste de Bériot and later became a student of Henri Vieuxtemps and Henryk Wieniawski. Aged 18, he started studying composition as a pupil of Salomon Jadassohn at the Leipzig Conservatory, where he struck up many friendships. Among these were Fritz Steinbach and Richard Sahla, a child prodigy like Sauret himself.

Sauret played in the most famous concert halls of his time. He made his American debut in 1872. Franz Liszt performed sonatas with him. In 1873, Sauret married Teresa Carreño, a Venezuelan pianist and composer, by whom he had a daughter, Emilita. The marriage did not last; in 1879 he remarried.

He held posts at a variety of institutions, including the Neue Akademie der Tonkunst in Berlin - where he wrote the Twelve Études Artistiques for his "beloved students" -, together with Moritz Moszkowski and the Scharwenka brothers, Xaver and Phillipp, and the Royal Academy of Music in London, where he was appointed a professor of violin of 1890, the Musical College in Chicago in 1903, and the Trinity College in London, an appointment he took up in 1908. His pupils included Tor Aulin, Jan Hambourg, William Henry Reed, Marjorie Hayward, Leila Waddell, Otie Chew Becker, Florizel von Reuter, Elsie Southgate, Gerald Walenn, John Waterhouse and Ethel Barns.  He died in London in 1920, aged 67.

Because of the excessive difficulties of his violin compositions, Émile Sauret is remembered today for little more than the cadenza for Niccolò Paganini's Violin Concerto No. 1 in D major.

Émile Sauret played on a violin of Guarnerius del Gesù (1744), named "Sauret". In 1986, it was bought by Itzhak Perlman.

Compositions (selection)
Op. 3, Caprice de Concert
Op. 6, 3 Morceaux de salon für Violine und Klavier
Op. 9, Scherzo fantastique
Op. 11, Souvenir de Los Angeles
Op. 13, 2 Impromptus für Violine und Klavier
Op. 24, 20 Grandes Études (1884)
Op. 26, Violin Concerto in D minor
Op. 27, Fantaisie brillante sur des airs espagnols
Op. 28, Feuillet d'Album
Op. 32, Rhapsodie russe
Op. 33, Danse polonaise
Op. 36, Gradus ad Parnassum (1894)
Op. 38, 12 Études artistiques
Op. 43, 6 Morceaux de salon
Op. 50, Scènes villageoises
Op. 52, Capriccio in B minor
Op. 57, Introduction et Valse de Concert (1898)
Op. 59, Rhapsodie suédoise
Op. 64, 24 Études Caprices (1902–03)
Op. 65, Souvenir de Hongrie. Andante et Caprice hongrois
Op. 66, 3 Morceaux de salon
Op. 67, Andante et Caprice de Concert
Op. 68, Suite für Violine solo (1907)
Op. 69, Chanson sans paroles et Mazurka
 Violin Concerto in E major
 Violin Sonata in A major
 Cadenza to Paganini's Violin Concerto No. 1 in D major, Op. 6
 Cadenza to Mozart's Violin Concerto No. 4, KV 218 
 Cadenza to Tartini's Devil's Trill Sonata

Bibliography
 Alberto Bachmann (tr. F. Martens): An Encyclopedia of the Violin (New York: Appleton, 1925)
 Andreas Moser (ed. by Hans-Joachim Nösselt): Geschichte des Violinspiels (Tutzing: Hans Schneider, 1967), vol. 2, pp. 174,176, and passim
 Willy Russ: Autographes de musiciens célèbres (Neuchâtel: Imprimerie Centrale, c. 1956)
 Stephen De'ak: David Popper (Neptune City, NJ: Paganiniana Publications, 1980)

References

External links
 
 Biography
  

1852 births
1920 deaths
19th-century classical composers
19th-century French male classical violinists
20th-century classical composers
Academics of the Royal Academy of Music
20th-century French male classical violinists
French male classical composers
French Romantic composers
People from Cher (department)